Kasriel is a given name. Notable people with the given name include:

Kasriel Broydo (1907–1945), Lithuanian songwriter, singer, and coupletist
Kasriel Hirsch Sarasohn (1835–1905), American journalist